The 1988 Coppa Italia Final was the final of the 1987–88 Coppa Italia. The match was played over two legs on 5 and 19 May 1988 between Sampdoria and Torino. Sampdoria won 3–2 on aggregate. It was Sampdoria's second victory.

First leg

Second leg

References
Coppa Italia 1987/88 statistics at rsssf.com
 https://www.calcio.com/calendario/ita-coppa-italia-1987-1988-finale/2/
 https://www.worldfootball.net/schedule/ita-coppa-italia-1987-1988-finale/2/

Coppa Italia Finals
Coppa Italia Final 1988
Coppa Italia Final 1988